Luis Enrique Carranza Vargas (born 18 August 1998) is a Peruvian footballer who plays as a winger for Peruvian Primera División side Carlos A. Mannucci.

Club career

Sporting Cristal
Carranza is a product of Sporting Cristal and was promoted to the club's reserve team for the 2016 season.

After a good season with the reserves, Carranza was loaned out to Peruvian Primera División club Ayacucho FC to gain some experience. Carranza already knew Ayacuchos head coach, Francisco Melgar, who formerly worked as a youth coach at Sporting Cristal. He made his debut on 4 February 2017, where he played the first half in Ayacucho's 1-0 loss to Sport Rosario. Carranza made a total of 28 league appearances for Ayacucho in that season.

After the end of the loan deal, he was sent out on loan yet again, this time to Universidad San Martín. However, he did only play six games and for that reason, he returned to Ayacucho FC for the 2019 season, again on a loan deal. The deal was also applicable for the 2020 season.

Ayacucho
After three previous loan spells at the club in 2017, 2019 and 2020, Carranza joined the club permanently ahead of the 2021 season.

Carlos A. Mannucci
On 24 November 2021 it was confirmed, that Carranza would join Carlos A. Mannucci for the 2022 season.

International career
In September 2017, Carranza was called up for the Peruvian U23 national team who was going to play the 2020 CONMEBOL Pre-Olympic Tournament. He participated in two games.

References

External links
 
 

Living people
1998 births
Association football wingers
Peruvian footballers
Peruvian Primera División players
Sporting Cristal footballers
Ayacucho FC footballers
Club Deportivo Universidad de San Martín de Porres players
Carlos A. Mannucci players
People from Lima